Santissimo Crocifisso, Barga
 Santissimo Crocifisso d’Ete, Mogliano
 Santissimo Crocifisso, San Giorgio su Legnano
 Santissimo Crocifisso, Tolentino
 Santissimo Crocifisso, Urbania